The Blind Date is a 2021 Ugandan film written and directed by Loukman Ali starring Martha Kay, Michael Wawuyo Jr. and Raymond Rushabiro. The short film marks the second collaboration between Usama Mukwaya and Loukman Ali after Kyaddala TV Series which was released in 2019. The Blind Date is the first of the numerous episodes meant to make an anthology, with the follow-up episode already in the making. The film won Best short film at the 8th Uganda Film Festival awards. It had its African premiere at the 24th Zanzibar International Film Festival.

Plot 
Jeff (Michael Wawuyo Jr.) has a crush on a girl (Martha Kay) that's way outside his social class but he won't let that stop him. He'll do whatever it takes, including breaking a few rules.

Cast 
 Martha Kay as Emily
 Michael Wawuyo Jr. as Jeff
 Raymond Rushabiro as Jacob
 Patriq Nkakalukanyi as Martin
 River Dan Rugaju as Nathan
 Allen Musumba as Jacobs Wife

Awards

Won
 2021: Best Short Film, Uganda Film Festival

Nominated
 2021: Best Short Film, 42 Durban International Film Festival

References

External links 
 

Ugandan short films
Films shot in Uganda
Films produced by Usama Mukwaya
2020s English-language films